Pomonkey Creek is a  tidal tributary of the Potomac River, near Bryans Road, Maryland.  It is named for the Pamunkey tribe of Native Americans that lived in the area.

See also
Pomonkey, Maryland

References

External links
Pomonkey Creek - Maryland

Rivers of Maryland
Rivers of Charles County, Maryland
Tributaries of the Potomac River